The 2017–18 Grand Canyon Antelopes men's basketball team represented Grand Canyon University during the 2017–18 NCAA Division I men's basketball season. They were led by head coach Dan Majerle in his fifth season at Grand Canyon. The Antelopes played their home games at the GCU Arena in Phoenix, Arizona as members of the Western Athletic Conference. They finished the season 22–12, 9–5 in WAC play to finish in third place. They defeated UMKC and Utah Valley to advance to the championship game of the WAC tournament where they lost to New Mexico. They were invited to the College Basketball Invitational where they lost in the first round to Mercer.

The season marked the Antelopes' first full season as a Division I school after a four-year transition period from Division II to Division I. This means the team was officially eligible for the NCAA tournament if they had qualified, as well as becoming fully eligible for the WAC tournament.

Previous season
The Antelopes finished the 2016–17 season 22–9, 11–3 in WAC play to finish in a tie for second place. Citing injuries, they decided to not participate in a postseason tournament. They had participated in the CIT the previous three seasons.

Offseason

Departures

Incoming transfers

Incoming recruits

Roster

Schedule and results

|-
!colspan=12 style=| Exhibition

|-
!colspan=12 style=| Regular season

|-
!colspan=12 style=| WAC tournament

|-
!colspan=12 style=| CBI

Source

References

Grand Canyon Antelopes men's basketball seasons
Grand Canyon
Grand Canyon
Grand Canyon Antelopes men's basketball
2018 in sports in Arizona